Britannia coins are British bullion coins issued by the Royal Mint in gold since 1987, in silver since 1997, and in platinum since 2018.  The coin patterns feature various depictions of Britannia, a feminine personification of the United Kingdom.

Britannia gold coins contain one troy ounce of gold and have a face value of £100. Gold Britannias also are issued in fractional sizes of one-half, one-quarter, and one-tenth of a troy ounce and with face values of £50, £25, and £10 respectively. In 2013 two additional sizes were introduced, a five-ounce coin of face value £500, and a fractional size of one-twentieth of face value £5.

Britannia silver coins contain one troy ounce of silver and have a face value of £2. Silver Britannias also are issued in fractional sizes of one-half, one-quarter, and one-tenth of a troy ounce and with face values of £1, 50p, and 20p respectively. Like the gold coins in 2013 two additional sizes were introduced, a five-ounce coin of face value £10, and a fractional size of one-twentieth of face value 10p.

Gold Britannia
From 2013 the gold coins have a millesimal fineness of 0.9999 (or 24 carat gold). Until 2012 the gold coins have a millesimal fineness of 0.917 (91.7% or 22 carat gold) with the non-gold component being copper until 1989 and silver from 1990.

2013– Gold Britannia specifications (gold content, and approx total weight)
Five ounces: diameter 65 mm, (156.295 g)
One ounce (2013) : diameter 38.61 mm, (31.104 g) 'larger thinner coin' just for 2013
One ounce (2014–) : diameter 32.69 mm, (31.104 g)
Half ounce: diameter 27 mm, (15.60 g)
One quarter ounce: diameter 22 mm, (7.86 g)
One tenth ounce: diameter 16.50 mm, (3.13 g)
One twentieth ounce: diameter 12 mm, (1.58 g)

1987–2012 Gold Britannia specifications (gold content, not total weight)
One ounce: diameter 32.69 mm, (31.104 g) (total wt 34.050 g)
Half ounce: diameter 27.00 mm, (15.552 g)
Quarter ounce: diameter 22.00 mm,(7.776 g)
Tenth ounce: diameter 16.50 mm, (3.110 g)

Gold Britannias are struck to an unlimited mintage every year.

Silver Britannia
Since 2013 the silver coins have been produced with a millesimal fineness of 0.999 (99.9% silver). They have a mass of 31.21 grams and diameter of 38.61 mm.

From 1997 to 2012 the silver coins had a millesimal fineness of 958 (95.8% or Britannia silver). Total mass 32.45 grams, diameter 40.00 mm.

Silver Britannias have been released each year beginning in 1997, when a silver proof set was offered. In 1998 and in all subsequent even-numbered years the reverse design has depicted a standing Britannia figure. Beginning in 1999 and continuing in odd-numbered years, a series of alternate, non-repeating depictions of Britannia have replaced the standing figure on the reverse. Starting in 2013, the proof versions of the coin will feature a different design each year, while the bullion version of the coin will always feature the classic standing Britannia. While mintage was limited prior to 2013, in 2013 and after mintage of the bullion version of the coin is unlimited based on demand.

Some 2014 silver Britannia coins were struck with the incorrect obverse as there was a mix up during the manufacturing process with the 'Lunar' Year of the Horse coins from The Royal Mint, as both coins were to the same fineness and specification, and similar but not identical obverse sides. It is thought that there are around 17,000 examples with the mis-strike, which have been dubbed the 'Mule Britannia' These coins have fetched substantial premiums on online auction sites.

Silver Britannia mintages
The following table has the most recent numbers of coins minted by year.

Coin designs

See also 

American Gold Eagle
Australian Gold Nugget
British Sovereign coin
Canadian Gold Maple Leaf
Austrian Philharmonic
Krugerrand
Chinese lunar coins
Gold as an investment
Silver as an investment

References 

Coins of England & The United Kingdom, 40th ed., Spink, 2005, 

British gold coins
Britannia
Bullion coins of the United Kingdom
Gold bullion coins
Silver bullion coins
Platinum bullion coins